The Juang are an Austroasiatic ethnic group found only in the Gonsaika hills of Keonjhar district of Odisha. Some Juangs, however migrated to neighbouring plains of Dhenkanal district of Odisha during the Bhuiyan revolt in the late 19th century. The 2011 census showed their population to be around 50,000. The Juang language belongs to the Munda family of the Austroasiatic languages. They are classified as a Scheduled Tribe by the Indian government.

History
The Juang claimed to have no traditions connecting them with any other ethnic group, and they repudiated all connection with the Hos or the Santals, declaring themselves the true aborigines. Their tradition claims that the place where the tribe originated from the earth are the Gonasika Hills, near Keonjhar, at the source of the Baitarani River. They were initially hunter-gatherers and cultivated few crops. They did not till the land, but lived on the game they killed or on snakes and insects. They were forced to stop following traditional customs after the British declared their forests as reserves.

After the British declared their forests as reserves, the Juangs were forced to look for an alternative way of sustainance. They were skilled at basket-weaving, which was in demand in nearby caste villages. The Juangs would exchange their baskets for salt, oil, food, money from the village traders.

Culture 
The Juang traditional huts measured about 6 by 8 ft., with very low doorways. The interior was divided into two compartments. In the first of these the father and all the females of a family lived together; the second was used as a storeroom. The boys had a separate hut at the entrance to the village, the Majang or dormitory which served as a guest-house and general assembly place where the musical instruments of the village were kept. Their traditional folk dance included vigorous dances mimicking birds and other animals. They celebrate festival such as Pusha Purnima, Amba Nuakhia, Pirha Puja, Akhaya Trutiya, Asarhi, Gahma etc.

Formerly the Juang used to be also known as Patuas, literally "leaf-wearers". Traditionally the women wore girdles of leaves, while the men wore a small loincloth. The Juangs declare that the river goddess, emerging for the first time from the Gonasika rock, surprised a party of naked Juangs dancing, and ordered them to wear leaves, with the threat that they should die if they ever gave up the custom. The Juangs' weapons were the bow and arrow and a sling made entirely of cord.

Their traditional religion included a belief in forest spirits. They offered sacrifices of fowls to the sun when in trouble and to the earth for a bountiful harvest. Polygamy was rare. They burned their dead and disposed of the ashes into any running stream. The most sacred oaths a Juang could take are those on an ant-hill or a tiger-skin.

Reference

Scheduled Tribes of India
Social groups of Odisha
Scheduled Tribes of Odisha